Talk of the Devil is a 1936 British crime film directed by Carol Reed and starring Ricardo Cortez, Sally Eilers and Basil Sydney.

Reed had previously been working for Ealing Studios, but he made the film for the independent producer Herbert Wilcox. It was the first film to be completely made at the recently opened Pinewood Studios. The film's sets were designed by the art director Wilfred Arnold.

It remains one of Reed's most obscure films and was for many years out of circulation, although the BFI National Archive holds a copy. The film was poorly received in its time and did little to boost Reed's standing in the British film industry.

Premise
A dishonest shipbuilder plans to frame his half-brother for his own criminal activities.

Cast
 Ricardo Cortez as Ray Allen 
 Sally Eilers as Ann Marlow 
 Basil Sydney as Stephen Rindlay 
 Randle Ayrton as John Findlay 
 Charles Carson as Lord Dymchurch 
 Frederick Culley as Mr Alderson 
 Anthony Holles as Colquhoun 
 Gordon McLeod as Inspector 
 Denis Cowles as Philip Couls 
 Quentin McPhearson as Angus 
 Langley Howard as Clerk 
 Margaret Rutherford as Housekeeper 
 Moore Marriott as Dart-thrower

References

Bibliography
 Moss, Robert. Films of Carol Reed. Springer, 2016. 
 Pykett, Derek. British Horror Film Locations. McFarland & Company, 2008.

External links

1936 films
British crime films
1936 crime films
Films directed by Carol Reed
Films shot at Pinewood Studios
Films set in England
United Artists films
British black-and-white films
British and Dominions Studios films
Films scored by Percival Mackey
1930s English-language films
1930s British films